is a passenger railway station in the city of Takasaki, Gunma, Japan, operated by the private railway operator Jōshin Dentetsu.

Lines

Station layout
The station consists of a single island platform connected to the station building by a level crossing.

Platforms

Adjacent stations

History
Maniwa Station opened on 5 May 1897.

Surrounding area
Yoshii Maniwa Post Office
 Maniwa Nen-ryū training center

See also
 List of railway stations in Japan

External links

 Official home page 
 Burari-Gunma 

Railway stations in Gunma Prefecture
Railway stations in Japan opened in 1897
Takasaki, Gunma